Constitutional Assembly elections were held in South Vietnam on 4 March 1956. A total of 431 candidates contested the 123 seats from all five registered pro-government political parties, with 11 elected as pro-government independents. Edward Miller notes that the election was relatively free and fair in comparison to 1955 State of Vietnam referendum, as independent and opposition candidates were allowed to contest the seats, and opposition campaigns were allowed. However, campaign materials had to be screened, and the government was allowed to suspend candidates on the basis of their links with Viet Minh and other rebel groups. Two deputies were not permitted to take seats due to electoral violations, making the total number of deputies seated at 121. On 26 October the body was transformed into the National Assembly after the new constitution came into effect.

Results

References

South Vietnam
Constitutional Assembly election
Elections in South Vietnam
Election and referendum articles with incomplete results